Daniel Leonard (May 18, 1740 – June 27, 1829) was a lawyer from colonial Massachusetts and a Loyalist in the American Revolution.

Biography
Born in Norton, Massachusetts, Leonard was a member of a prominent family who made their fortune from their iron works in Taunton, Massachusetts. After graduating from Harvard College, Leonard began to practice law in Taunton.

During the Revolutionary crisis, the British Parliament passed the Massachusetts Government Act, which, among other things, abolished elections for the Massachusetts Governor's Council and instead called for the councilors to be appointed by the royal governor. Leonard accepted an appointment by Governor Thomas Hutchinson to this new royal-controlled Council. Massachusetts Patriots were outraged, and attacked Leonard's house. He fled to British-occupied Boston for safety.

In 1774 and 1775, Leonard, writing under the name "Massachusettensis," wrote a series of letters in support of royal government that were published in a Loyalist Boston newspaper, the Massachusetts Gazette.  John Adams, writing as "Novanglus," answered the letters in the Boston Gazette.  The exchange ceased with the Battles of Lexington and Concord.  Many, including Adams, erroneously believed that Jonathan Sewall had written the Massachusettensis letters.

During the War of Independence, Leonard left with the British when they evacuated Boston in 1776. His property, like that of other Loyalists, was confiscated.

Exiled from Massachusetts, he served as Chief Justice of Bermuda from 1782 to 1806, and later retired to London. In 1821, he revealed himself to be "Massachusettensis."

References

External links
 
 
Berkin, Carol. "Leonard, Daniel". American National Biography Online, February 2000.
Massachusetts Historical Society, The Adams Papers, The Letters of Novanglus, accessed on March 2, 2014.

1740 births
1829 deaths
Customs officers
American Loyalists from Massachusetts
Harvard College alumni
Harvard College Loyalists in the American Revolution
Members of the colonial Massachusetts Governor's Council
Politicians from Taunton, Massachusetts
Chief justices of Bermuda